The Scotland women's national ice hockey team represents Scotland in international ice hockey competitions. Since 1991, the team has participated in four friendlies.

All-time record against other nations

References

Women's national ice hockey teams in Europe

Ice hockey